Éric Berthon (born 10 October 1961) is a French freestyle skier. He competed in the men's moguls event at the 1992 Winter Olympics.

References

1961 births
Living people
French male freestyle skiers
Olympic freestyle skiers of France
Freestyle skiers at the 1992 Winter Olympics
Sportspeople from Mulhouse